The Lola T96/00 is an open-wheel racing car chassis, designed and built by Lola Cars that competed in the CART open-wheel racing series, for competition in the 1996 IndyCar season. It was slightly more competitive than its predecessors, scoring 8 wins that season. It was mainly powered by the  Ford/Cosworth XB turbo engine, but also used the Mercedes-Benz IC108 engine, and the Honda turbo Indy V8 engine.

References 

Open wheel racing cars
American Championship racing cars
Lola racing cars